GFO may refer to:

 Bartica Airport, in Guyana
 General formal ontology
 Geosat Follow-On, a satellite mission
 Glasgow Film Office
 Government Finance Office of the Government of Saskatchewan, Canada